Veer railway station located in Mahad taluka in Raigad  is a station on Konkan Railway. It serves villages including Dasgaon, Veer, Vahoor,Tempale,Lonere,and Mahadcity. It is at a distance of  down from origin. The preceding railway station on the north of Kokan railway line is Goregaon railway station (a halt station) and the next railway station on southern side is Karanjadi railway station (also a halt station). Veer railway station on Konkan Railway is the nearest railway station to industrial town of Mahad in Maharashtra state of India.

References

Railway stations along Konkan Railway line
Railway stations in Raigad district
Railway stations opened in 1993
Ratnagiri railway division